Belcaro (also commonly known as Phipps Mansion) is a historic mansion and private residence in Denver, Colorado, specifically in the southeast Belcaro, Denver neighborhood at the corner of Madison Street and Belcaro Drive. Built between 1931 and 1933, the  Georgian style Phipps Mansion consists of more than seventy rooms, two of which were imported from England. The facility is decorated in the Chippendale and Queen Anne styles and features European, American, and Asian art.

Lawrence Cowle Phipps commissioned the mansion with his third wife, Margaret Rogers (daughter of  Denver mayor Judge Rogers), hoping  to provide jobs during the Great Depression. They called the residence Belcaro, which is Italian for "dear one". The neighborhood surrounding the mansion was developed by Phipps' Belcaro Realty and Investment Company and is called Belcaro.

Mr. and Mrs. Phipps
Mr. Phipps moved to Colorado in 1901 looking to raise a family and give back to the community with his wealth. Mrs. Phipps was very active with the University of Denver and the Denver Museum of Nature and Science. Her father was the mayor of Denver from 1891 to 1893.

History
The elegant Georgian mansion, spacious Tudor and Mediterranean style tennis pavilion with historically designed gardens and grounds combine to form what many believe is the region's premier estate. Architects Fisher & Fisher designed the mansion, which was later built by Platt Rogers Jr., brother of Mrs. Phipps. Mrs. Phipps gave the tennis pavilion to the University of Denver in 1960 and, with the consent of her two sons, Gerald and Allen, gave the University of Denver the mansion in 1964. The Phipps home has been designated by the university as the "Margaret Rogers Phipps House"; the estate is known as the Lawrence C. Phipps Memorial Conference Center.  Colleagues of Fisher and Fisher called the mansion "a Colorado masterpiece."  Annette Hoyt Flanders designed the artistic landscaping. While it was built largely from local products, the house contains antiques, art work, tapestries, sculpture and rare books from around the world.

The university operated the mansion as the "Phipps Memorial Conference Center". The center is situated on 5 acres of landscaped grounds, and includes The Phipps Mansion, The Phipps Tennis Pavilion, and Phipps Catering Services. Over the past four decades, the mansion has been a popular venue for weddings, various corporate and philanthropic events, as well as receptions and other celebrations. World leaders for the Summit of the Eight conference met at the mansion in 1997.

The Tennis Pavilion is also reported to be the very first indoor tennis facility built west of the Mississippi River.

Room descriptions
The mansion has  of floor space, with fourteen rooms on the first floor and seven bedrooms with dressing rooms, suites and baths and a sitting room on the second floor.

Dining Room

This Georgian style room is more than 250 years old. The paneling is knotty pine, which was sent from Colonial America to England where it was made into this dignified paneled room, then later installed in the mansion. There is a Waterford chandelier, which hangs from the center of the ceiling and complements the original dining room chairs. The dining room chairs were carved from the beams of a house built in Santo Domingo in 1509. There is also a painting on the north wall by Hudson River Valley artist Albert Bierstadt.

Billiard Room

The oak walls in this room are from England and are almost 400 years old. There are hidden panels in this Jacobean room, which were used for storing billiard balls and cues. The ceiling depicts an illustration of the War of Roses.

Living Room

This  room has Austrian oak paneling and a carving of a bald eagle over the fireplace. The chandeliers are Sheffield Sterling, and the carving over the hall door portrays the Phipps' family crest.

Library

A limewood carving over the fireplace in the style of Grinling Gibbons was commissioned by the Phipps family. Many first editions and volumes from all over the world
line the walls of this library.

Staircase

The grand staircase features a banister created by Burkhardt Steel of Denver. Andrew Carnegie presented the massive Swiss grandfather clock, located at the top of the staircase, to  Lawrence Cowle Phipps as a gift.

Foyer

The foyer contains the original organ that was placed in the alcove. The device that ran the organ was located in a room directly underneath the foyer and the pipes ran upward behind the tapestries.

Return to private use
As of April 2010, the mansion was sold to Denver philanthropist Tim Gill and his husband, Ambassador Scott Miller. Proceeds from the sale of the Phipps Mansion, valued at more than $9 million, were added to an existing Phipps endowment at the University of Denver.

References

Residential buildings in Denver
Houses completed in 1933
1933 establishments in Colorado